Ekla Akash is a 2012 Indian Bengali film directed by Sandipan Roy. The lead actor of this film is Parambrata Chatterjee.

Plot
 
Ekla Akash is a story of love, despair, infidelity and a tragedy in general. It deals with a troubled marriage between a young couple, Arijit and Nisha. The ambitious couple have reached a point in their relationship from where there is no turning back so they continue to live with each other and their child is also born. Arijit’s infidelity is primarily the reason as he is having an affair with his colleague . Arijit also has questions regarding Nisha’s special relationship with her mentor S.R, who is a film director and wants to make a film star. Eventually he does make her a star, but it only makes things worse.

The film is an extremely dramatic film and can be depressing for most people. You might even hate Arijit and call him names, but eventually that anger lessens because he realizes the meaning of true love, of a family, of what it feels to be like a father and what he had done with his life so far. Though the relationship is at crossroads, yet both of realize their own mistakes and come back to each other, but then it is too late. Everything happens at the cost of losing their only child to a lung disease. This tragic ending perhaps heightens the drama of the film and makes it worth watching which was perhaps not so initially. Goutam Ghosh also plays a very interesting role as S.R, Nisha’a mentor who just sees talent in his protege and that is all there is to that relationship. There is love and affection between the two-but of that between a mentor and his protege, nothing else. He is a happy go lucky scion of a North Kolkata family who stays in a sprawling mansion literally all by himself and he finally finds peace when he goes to Darjeeling as the music teacher of Disha’s school. The film proves once again that nothing can replace the love between a husband and a wife no matter how many affairs you indulge in because somewhere down the line it is devoid and empty and does not have any lasting value or feelings . However, if you realize things too late, things can be tragic as in this film.

Credits

Cast
 Parambrata Chatterjee
 Deboleena Dutta
 Parno Mittra
Rudranil Ghosh
 Gautam Ghosh

Crew
Director: Sandipan Roy
Script & dialogue: Shibashis Bandyopadhyay
Producer: Morning fresh media pvt. ltd.
Cinematographer: Manoj Mishra
Editing: Arghyakamal Mitra
Music: Jeet Gannguli
Creative Director: Shibashis Bandyopadhyay

Soundtrack

References

Bengali-language Indian films
2010s Bengali-language films
Films scored by Jeet Ganguly